The 1962 Central State Bronchos football team represented Central State College—now known as the University of Central Oklahoma—during the 1962 NAIA football season. The team was led by head coach Al Blevins. They played their home games at Central Field in Edmond, Oklahoma.

Schedule

References

Central State
Central Oklahoma Bronchos football seasons
NAIA Football National Champions
College football undefeated seasons
Central State Bronchos football